Colin Blackwell (born March 28, 1993) is an American professional ice hockey center for the Chicago Blackhawks of the National Hockey League (NHL).

Early life
Blackwell was born on March 28, 1993, to parents Jim and Carla Blackwell in North Andover, Massachusetts. Growing up, he was a fan of the New England Patriots, Boston Red Sox, Boston Celtics, and Boston Bruins. From 2004 until 2010, Blackwell played with the Valley Junior Warriors from Peewee minors through the U16 level.

Playing career

Collegiate
Blackwell played high school hockey with St. John's Prep in Massachusetts from 2007 to 2011. A standout with St. John's, where he recorded 66 points in just 25 games, Blackwell was selected by the San Jose Sharks in the seventh round, 194th overall, in the 2011 NHL Entry Draft.

Blackwell embarked on a collegiate career with Harvard University of the ECAC. During his tenure with the Crimson, Blackwell was affected by a concussion injury, forcing him to sit out the majority of his junior and senior seasons. He returned towards the end of his senior year in 2014–15, appearing in 11 games to help the team claim the ECAC Tournament Championship.

Following his redshirt senior season, Blackwell began his professional career in the 2016–17 season, signing a one-year AHL contract with the San Jose Barracuda, primary affiliate to the San Jose Sharks. In a checking line role, Blackwell produced 11 points in 57 games before making 15 post-season appearances in the playoffs.

Professional
As a free agent, Blackwell left the Sharks organization to participate in the Buffalo Sabres rookie camp, before joining its AHL affiliate, the Rochester Americans, on a professional tryout to begin the 2017–18 season. He produced 3 points in 8 games before securing an AHL contract with the Americans on November 2, 2017. He continued to find an offensive role with the Americans, increasing his points totals to lead all forwards with 17 goals and 45 points in 61 games.

On July 3, 2018, Blackwell signed his first NHL contract as a free agent, agreeing to a two-year, two-way deal with the Nashville Predators. After attending the Predators training camp, Blackwell was re-assigned to start the 2018–19 season with AHL affiliate, the Milwaukee Admirals. Despite missing 27 games through injury, Blackwell recorded 7 goals in 14 games to earn his first recall to the Predators on January 19, 2019. He made his NHL debut the same day, playing on the fourth line, in a 4–2 defeat to the Florida Panthers at Bridgestone Arena.

On October 9, 2020, Blackwell was signed as a free agent a two-year contract worth $725,000 annually with the New York Rangers, with the second year of his contract on a one-way basis. In the pandemic delayed  season, on January 24, 2021, Blackwell made his Rangers debut during a game against the Pittsburgh Penguins and scored his first goal with the team, despite a 3–2 loss. On March 28, which happened to be Blackwell's 28th birthday, Colin scored a career-high two goals against the Washington Capitals. He became the eighth Ranger to have a multi-goal game on his birthday, the first player since Ryan Callahan on March 21, 2009. In a break out season with the Rangers, Blackwell finished with 12 goals and 22 points through 47 regular season games.

On July 21, 2021, Blackwell was selected from the Rangers at the 2021 NHL Expansion Draft by the Seattle Kraken. Blackwell scored eight goals and 17 points in 38 games for Seattle.

On March 20, 2022, Blackwell was traded from Seattle at the NHL trade deadline to the Toronto Maple Leafs with Mark Giordano in exchange for a second-round pick in 2022 and 2023 and a third-round pick in 2024. Blackwell scored two goals and three points in 19 games for Toronto to finish the regular season, then added one goal and two points in seven playoff games during the Leafs' first-round loss to the Lightning.

On July 13, Blackwell signed a two-year, $2.4 million contract with the Chicago Blackhawks as a free agent.

Career statistics

Regular season and playoffs

International

Awards and honors

References

External links

1993 births
Living people
American men's ice hockey centers
Chicago Blackhawks players
Harvard Crimson men's ice hockey players
Milwaukee Admirals players
Nashville Predators players
New York Rangers players
Rochester Americans players
San Jose Sharks draft picks
San Jose Barracuda players
Seattle Kraken players
Toronto Maple Leafs players